Bob Martin may refer to:

People 
 Bob Martin (Australian politician) (born 1945), Member of the New South Wales Legislative Assembly
 Bob Martin (American football) (born 1953), American football player
 Bob Martin (basketball) (born 1969), American basketball player
 Bob Martin (curler), (born c. 1953), English curler
 Bob Martin (golfer) (1848–1917), British golfer
 Bob Martin (boxer) (1897–1978), American boxer and soldier
 Bob Martin (singer-songwriter) (born 1942), U.S.-American
 Stephen Donaldson (activist) (1946–1996), aka Bob Martin or Donny the Punk
 Bob Martin (singer) (1922–1998), Austrian participant in the 1957 Eurovision Song Contest
 Bob Martin (comedian) (born 1962), star and co-writer of the Broadway musical, The Drowsy Chaperone
 Robert "Bob" Martin (1948–2020), American magazine editor and screenwriter
 Bob Martin (rower) (1925–2012), American Olympic rower
 Robert C. Martin, American software author and consultant, known as Uncle Bob

Other 
 Bob Martin (TV series), a British situation comedy
 Bob Martin Petcare, British pet healthcare company

See also 
 Robert Martin (disambiguation)
 Bobby Martin (disambiguation)

Martin, Bob